Andrej Bagar (29 October 1900 – 31 July 1966) was a Slovak film and theatre actor and theatre director. He appeared in 16 films between 1935 and 1965.

Selected filmography
 Jánošík (1935)
 Warning (1946)
The Struggle Will End Tomorrow (1951)

References

External links
 

1900 births
1966 deaths
Slovak male film actors
People from Trenčianske Teplice
20th-century Slovak male actors